The Albuquerque Tribune was an afternoon newspaper in Albuquerque, New Mexico, founded in 1922 by Carlton Cole Magee as Magee's Independent. It was published in the afternoon and evening Monday through Saturday.

Scott Ware served as editor from 1995 to 2001. Other notable journalists who worked at the Tribune included Ollie Reed, Joline Gutierrez Krueger, and Terri Burke, who later served as the executive director of the Texas ACLU.

On February 20, 2008, E. W. Scripps Company announced that the Tribune would close, effective February 23, 2008. The closure followed a seven-month effort by the company to sell the paper, which had declined in circulation from 42,000 in 1988 to about 10,000 in 2008. Governor Bill Richardson of New Mexico declared the paper's last day "Albuquerque Tribune Day" in his state, to "celebrate the Tribune'''s long and proud history and its honorable service to the state."

Eileen Welsome of The Albuquerque Tribune won the Pulitzer Prize for National Reporting in 1994 for her series entitled "The Plutonium Experiment", a series about human radiation experiments that took place at the Walter E. Fernald State School of Massachusetts, among other locations.

Logo
The paper's logo and the logo of the entire Scripps-Howard newspaper chain, depicting a lighthouse, was inspired by founder Magee's original slogan: "Give Light and the People Will Find Their Own Way"; the slogan had been adopted from Dante.

Joint operating agreement
On February 20, 1933, The Albuquerque Tribune formed the nation's first joint operating agreement (JOA), entitled the "Albuquerque Plan," with the Albuquerque Journal in response to the Great Depression of 1929. The JOA established the Albuquerque Publishing Company and merged the Albuquerque Evening Journal with the Tribune (which at this point changed its name from the New Mexico State Tribune to The Albuquerque Tribune.)  The Albuquerque Tribune and Albuquerque Journal merged presses, advertising and circulation while remaining as separate editorial entities. As part of the joint operating agreement, the Tribune was to be a local newspaper only, focusing on issues in the Albuquerque metropolitan area.

Although the JOA ended when Scripps shut down the newspaper, Scripps retained its stake (about 40%) in Albuquerque Publishing Company, giving Scripps a corresponding share in any future Albuquerque Journal profits. Scripps had not offered to sell its share in the JOA when it attempted to sell the paper, something that Editor & Publisher noted was another factor in Scripps' inability to find a buyer for the Tribune''.

References

External links
Scripps subsidiary profile of ''The Albuquerque Tribune

Mass media in Albuquerque, New Mexico
Defunct newspapers published in New Mexico
Daily newspapers published in the United States
1922 establishments in New Mexico
2008 disestablishments in New Mexico